The Time Tunnel is Malaysia's first memorabilia museum. Located in Brinchang, it is one of the main attractions of the Cameron Highlands. 

Established in January 2007, the museum is filled with more than 4,000 collectibles and memorabilia. They are showcased in eight galleries covering an area of approximately 1,300 square metres.

Collection highlights

Aborigine Section
This area captures the lifestyle of the resort's natives (Orang Asli). Their tools, traps and handicrafts are exhibited on the floor and on the walls.

'Barber Shop'
The 'barber shop' is equipped with mirrors, straight razors, scissors, hair sprays, shavers, hair dryers, clippers, curlers and a broad range of combs. The walls are plastered with posters that were once used to promote barbering. The showpiece of this "shop" is the barber chair. It is more than 50 years old.

Children’s Corner
This space is filled with blackboards, school uniforms, furniture, counting aids and a variety of toys. Nearby is a cabinet that displays memorabilia like fountain pens, erasers, pencil sharpeners, rulers, textbooks and school badges.

‘Coffee Shop’
Resembling an old eatery (’kopi tiam’), this setup comes complete with a cashier's counter, stools, tables, mirrors, ashtrays, matchboxes, chopsticks, spittoons, coffee cups and a collection of soft drinks. The drinks here are not for sale.

Collectibles & Memorabilia
The list of collectibles and memorabilia is endless. There are more than 4,000 objects on display. They range from gramophones to jewellery pieces.

Jim Thompson Corner
The niche is tucked at the midpoint of the museum. It covers an area of approximately 10 square metres. Most of the items on exhibit are a reminiscence of Jim Thompson who disappeared from the Cameron Highlands on Sunday, 26 March 1967.

Kitchen Area
Located along the ledge of the unit's second level is the kitchen area. This is a place where time virtually comes to a stand still. Here you will find an oddball mix of kerosene stoves, frying pans, crockery items, woks, chili pounders, firewood, meat safes, charcoal stoves, meat grinders and tiffin carriers.

Photo Gallery
The museum is known for its assortment of old photographs. It has an inventory of more than 1,000 images which include photographs of:
 P. Ramlee’s identification card;
 S.K. Convent (when it served as the British Military Hospital in the 1950s);
 Jim Thompson, the Thai silk king;

 All Soul’s Church (undated);
 Ye Olde Smokehouse Inn (1950s);
 "Moonlight" bungalow (undated);
 "Sunlight" bungalow (undated);
 the bridge over the Sultan Abu Bakar dam (1960s);
 the Government Rest House at Tanah Rata (1950s);
 the 2nd hole of the Cameron Highlands Golf Course (1930s);
 Brinchang (1950s);
 Tanah Rata (1940s);
 Cluny Lodge (1960s);
 Father's House (1950s);
 Lutheran Mission bungalow (undated);
 Tanah Rata post office (1950s);
 the Cameron Highlands Home Guard (1950s); and
 the then Hongkong & Shanghai Banking Corporation (HSBC) when it moved to Tanah Rata in 1947.

Gallery

Milestones
The museum was visited by Miss Hong Kong 2008 (Ms Edelweiss Cheung), 1st and 2nd runners-up (Ms Skye Chan and Ms Sia Ma) during their tour of Malaysia in August 2008. Their visitation was organised by Hong Kong's Television Broadcasts Limited, Tourism Malaysia and Hong Thai Travel Services.

In June 2018, the museum opened a second space in Ipoh known as the Time Tunnel Ipoh Old Town museum. One of its early visitors was HE Andrew Goledzinowski, the Australian High Commissioner to Malaysia.

See also

 List of museums in Malaysia

References

Notes

News articles

External links 
 Cameron Highlands website
 Time Tunnel (museum) Cameron Highlands

Cameron Highlands
Museums in Malaysia
Tourist attractions in Pahang
Buildings and structures in Pahang
2007 establishments in Malaysia